Eutreta hespera is a species of fruit fly in the family Tephritidae.

Distribution
United States, Canada.

References

Tephritinae
Insects described in 1926
Diptera of North America